John Ayscough Nunn (19 March 1906 – 6 April 1987) was an English first-class cricketer active 1926–1946 who played for Middlesex and Oxford University. He was born in Hadley, Barnet, Hertfordshire; died in Colintraive, Argyll.

References

1906 births
1987 deaths
English cricketers
Middlesex cricketers
Oxford University cricketers
Free Foresters cricketers
Alumni of New College, Oxford